Vasyl Protyvsikh (born Vasyl Vasylyovych Humenyuk, born October 16, 1946) is a Ukrainian politician. He is best known as a self-nominated candidate in the 2010 Ukrainian presidential election, for which he changed his second name to Protyvsikh (ukr. for "Against all"). During the 2010 election he received 0.16% of the votes.

Biography
Vasyliy Humenyuk completed a law degree at the Ivan Franko National University of Lviv after serving in the Soviet army. As a member of the Communist Party of Ukraine (although he insist he "never was and never will be a Leninist") Humenyuk was mayor of Yaremche from 1984 until the first democratic local elections in Ukraine in 1991. Later he headed the customs service in Ivano-Frankivsk Oblast. Humenyuk was numbered number 23 at party list of the electoral bloc KUCHMA during the 2007 Ukrainian parliamentary election.

Vasyliy nominated himself for the 2010 Ukrainian presidential election. On October 2, 2009 he changed his second name to Protyvsikh, that can be translated as "Against-everyone". Protyvsikh changed his surname to “express the opinions of all those citizens that are against all candidates and the disorder that Ukraine currently finds itself in”.

Protyvsikh claims "friends from around the world" assisted him in obtained the UAH 2.5 million deposit needed for his registration as presidential candidate. Protyvsikh considered Yulia Tymoshenko his main opponent in the presidential elections.

Currently Protyvsikh is president of the Ivano-Frankivsk Chamber of Commerce. Protyvsikh wants Ukraine to have a banking system as Switzerland.

References

1946 births
Living people
People from Ivano-Frankivsk Oblast
Mayors of places in Ukraine
Candidates in the 2010 Ukrainian presidential election